Beyond Evil is a 2021 South Korean television series starring Shin Ha-kyun and Yeo Jin-goo. It aired on JTBC from February 19 to April 10, 2021. It received seven nominations at the 57th Baeksang Arts Awards, winning three – Best Drama, Best Screenplay, and Best Actor for Shin Ha-kyun. It was also selected as one of the final candidates for the Baeksang Arts Award Grand Prize – Television.

Synopsis
Beyond Evil follows the story of two fearless policemen from the Manyang Police Substation of the Munju Police Station (located in the western part of Gyeonggi Province), Lee Dong-sik (Shin Ha-kyun) and Han Joo-won (Yeo Jin-goo), who break the law to catch a serial killer. In the course of uncovering the culprit's identity, they question the innocence of everyone involved in the case, including themselves. "Who is the monster?" "Is it you?" "Is it me?" "Is it us?"

Inspiration
While the plot appears to make some allusions to Korea's Hwaseong serial murders case, the show is not based on a true story, and is solely a work of fiction. The similarities can be explained by inspiration drawn from Memories of Murder (2003) by Bong Joon-ho.

Cast

Main
 Shin Ha-kyun as Lee Dong-sik
 Lee Do-hyun as young Lee Dong-sik
An impulsive and eccentric sergeant at the Manyang Police Substation. Once a capable detective, he has been demoted to doing largely menial and tedious tasks.
 Yeo Jin-goo as Han Joo-won
 Jung Hyeon-jun as young Han Joo-won
An elite detective from the International Crime Investigation Team at the Department of Foreign Affairs of the Seoul Metropolitan Police Agency transferred to Manyang Police Substation. Good-looking and highly capable, he has great influence due to being the son of a prominent police chief.

Supporting

Manyang Butcher's Shop 
 Choi Sung-eun as Yoo Jae-yi
Nicknamed the "Master of Knife", the owner of the Manyang Butcher Shop and Restaurant.

Manyang Police Substation 
 Chun Ho-jin as Nam Sang-bae
The soon-to-retire Chief of Manyang Police Substation.
 Son Sang-gyu as Cho Gil-gu
A Sargeant at Manyang Police Substation.
  as Hwang Kwang-young
A police officer at Manyang Police Substation.
 Nam Yoon-su as Oh Ji-hoon
The youngest police officer at the Manyang Police Substation and the brother of Oh Ji-hwa.

Munju Police Station 
  as Park Jeong-je
 Choi Chan-ho as young Park Jeong-je
The Lieutenant of the Investigation Support Team at Munju Police Station, Lee Dong-sik's best friend, and son of congresswoman Do Hae-won.
 Kim Shin-rok as Oh Ji-hwa
Nam Ga-hyeon as young Oh Ji-hwa
The team leader of the Dangerous Crimes Division, Lee Dong-sik's classmate from elementary to high school, and the former wife of CEO Lee Chang-jin.
 Shim Wan-joon as Kang Do-soo
An honest homicide detective at Munju Police Station whose role model is Dong-sik
  as Jung Cheol-mun
Chief of Munju Police Station.
 Seo Jeong-shik as Kwak Oh-sub
Senior detective at Munju Police Station.
 Park Bo-kyung as Im Sun-nyeo
Captain of the Forensic Investigation Team and Kang Do-soo's wife.
 Yoo Byung-hoon as Lieutenant Ha

Manyang People 
Gil Hae-yeon as Do Hae-won
The current councilwoman and aspiring mayoral candidate of Munju, and mother of Park Jeong-je.
 Heo Sung-tae as Lee Chang-jin
 The CEO of JL Construction and the Chairperson of the Munju City Dream Town Development Committee.
 Lee Kyu-hoi as Kang Jin-mook
Park Kwang-il as young Kang Jin-mook
 The owner of the Manyang Supermarket, Dong-sik's adopted brother, and the father of Kang Min-jung.
 Kang Min-ah as Kang Min-jung 
 She is the daughter of Kang Jin-mook, the owner of Manyang Supermarket.
 Kim Hieora as Bang Ju-seon
 Jung Jae-jin as Bang Ho-cheol, Bang Ju-seon's father.
 Jun Soo-hyun as Jang Oh-bok, Do Hae-won's secretary and bodyguard.
 Kim Jung-eun as Lee Kang-ja, Cho Gil-gu's wife.

People around Han Joo-won
 Choi Jin-ho as Han Gi-hwan
Han Joo-won's father and front-runner for the next Commissioner of the National Police Agency.
  as Kwon Hyuk
A Munju City prosecutor who was once Joo-won's private high school tutor.
 Woo Jung-won as Lee Su-yeon
 Han Gi-hwan's wife and Han Joo-won's mother.

People around Lee Dong-shik
 Moon Joo-yeon as Lee Yu-yeon
 Dong-sik's fraternal twin sister.
 Park Myung-shin as Kim Yeong-hui
 Yu-yeon & Dong-shik's mother
 Kim Jung-ho as Yu-yeon & Dong-shik's father

Others
 Cha Chung-hwa as Lee Geum-hwa
 Kim Bi-bi as Han Jeong-im
 Jang Sung-bum as Lee Sang-yeob
 Kang You-seok as Reporter Lim Gyu-seok
 Nam Mi-jung as Fish market lady
 Park Ji-ah as Neighborhood woman
 Jo Ji-seung as Yoon Mi-hye, Kang Min-jung's mother

Production
Shin Ha-kyun and Yeo Jin-goo previously appeared in the film No Mercy for the Rude (2006) where Yeo played the younger version of Shin's character.

Original soundtrack

Part 1

Part 2

Part 3

Viewership

Awards and nominations

Listicle

Notes

References

External links
  
 
 
 

JTBC television dramas
Korean-language television shows
2021 South Korean television series debuts
2021 South Korean television series endings
South Korean crime television series
South Korean police procedural television series
Psychological thriller television series
South Korean thriller television series
Television series about fictional serial killers
Television series by JTBC Studios
Television series by Celltrion Entertainment